United Nations Security Council resolution 501, adopted on 25 February 1982, after recalling previous resolutions on the topic, particularly Resolution 425 (1978), and considering a report from the Secretary-General on the United Nations Interim Force in Lebanon (UNIFIL), the Council noted the continuing need for the Force given the situation between Israel and Lebanon.

The resolution went on to increase the size of UNIFIL from 6,000 to 7,000 personnel, and then reiterated the objectives of the Force, including the demand that it be free to operate in the region without restriction.

Resolution 501 was adopted by 13 votes to none, while the People's Republic of Poland and Soviet Union abstained from voting.

See also
 Blue Line
 Israeli–Lebanese conflict
 List of United Nations Security Council Resolutions 501 to 600 (1982–1987)

References
Text of the Resolution at undocs.org

External links
 

 0501
Israeli–Lebanese conflict
 0501
1982 in Israel
1982 in Lebanon
 0501
February 1982 events